The 10th Division was a regular army formation of the VIII Corps of the Ottoman Army. The division was composed of three infantry regiments the 28th, 29th and 30th. The 4th Battalion Engineers and a battery of 5.9-inch howitzers.

References

Military units and formations of the Ottoman Empire in World War I
Infantry divisions of the Ottoman Empire